David Burke (born 3 February 1975 in Liverpool, Merseyside) is an English boxer who won the bronze medal in the Men's Featherweight (– 57 kg) division at the 1996 European Amateur Boxing Championships in Vejle, Denmark.

Nicknamed Burkey, Burke represented Great Britain at the 1996 Summer Olympics in Atlanta, Georgia. There he was stopped in the first round of the Men's Featherweight division by Germany's Falk Huste. He was affiliated with the Salisbury Amateur Boxing Club.

References

External links 
 
 

1975 births
Living people
English male boxers
Featherweight boxers
Boxers at the 1996 Summer Olympics
Olympic boxers of Great Britain
Boxers from Liverpool
English Olympic competitors